Housing Project is John Hartford's fourth album, released in 1968. Like all of his RCA recordings, it was reissued in 2002 as part of a "twofer" CD, combined with his third album, The Love Album.

Reception

Music critic Richie Unterberger, writing for AllMusic, called the album "off-kilter country-pop with liberal smidgens of bluegrass and intellectual folk-rock lyricism. It was little less ornately produced than its immediate predecessor, The Love Album, but the arrangements remained chock-full of surprising interjections..."

Track listing
All tracks written by John Hartford.
"Housing Project"
"I'm Still Here"
"Crystallia Daydream"
"The Girl with the Long Brown Hair"
"I Didn't Know the World Would Last This Long"
"The Sailboat Song"
"The Category Stomp"
"Go Fall Asleep Now"
"My Face"
"Big Blue Balloon"
"In Like Of"
"Shiny Rails of Steel"

Personnel
John Hartford – banjo, guitar, fiddle, vocals

References

1968 albums
John Hartford albums
RCA Victor albums
Albums produced by Felton Jarvis